Gusztáv Lifkai (also known as Lifka; June 11, 1912 – ?) was a Hungarian field hockey player who competed in the 1936 Summer Olympics.

In 1936 he was a member of the Hungarian team, which was eliminated in the group stage of the Olympic tournament. He played all three matches as back.

External links
 
Gusztáv Lifkai's profile at Sports Reference.com
Gusztáv Lifkai's profile at the Hungarian Olympic Committee  

1912 births
Year of death missing
Hungarian male field hockey players
Olympic field hockey players of Hungary
Field hockey players at the 1936 Summer Olympics